The men's 62 kg competition of the weightlifting events at the 2015 Pan American Games in Toronto, Canada, was held on July 11 at the Oshawa Sports Centre. The defending champion was Óscar Figueroa from Colombia.

Each lifter performed in both the snatch and clean and jerk lifts, with the final score being the sum of the lifter's best result in each. The athlete received three attempts in each of the two lifts; the score for the lift was the heaviest weight successfully lifted. This weightlifting event was the lightest men's event at the weightlifting competition, limiting competitors to a maximum of 62 kilograms of body mass.

Schedule
All times are Eastern Daylight Time (UTC-4).

Results
5 athletes from four countries took part.

References

External links
Weightlifting schedule

Weightlifting at the 2015 Pan American Games